The Department of Philosophy is an academic division in the Faculty of Arts and Humanities at University College London.

Affiliated centres 
 The Keeling Centre for Ancient Philosophy (named after Stanley Victor Keeling)
 Watling Archive (archive of John Leonard Watling's published and unpublished writings)

Rankings 
The Philosophical Gourmet Report 2021-22 lists the department at 6th in the UK and 41st in the English-speaking world.

QS World University Rankings places the department at 7th in the UK and 20th globally in 2019.

Permanent Faculty

Honorary Faculty
 Tamsin De Waal 
 M.M. McCabe
 Anthony Savile 
 Victor Verdejo 
 Jonathan Wolff 
 Arnold Zuboff

Emeritus Professors
 Malcolm Budd
 Marcus Giaquinto
 Ted Honderich
 Paul Snowdon

Notable alumni
Keith Simmons
David Conway
James Garvey
Momtazuddin Ahmed
Marjorie Wallace
Ricky Gervais
Peter Warlock
Jonathan Dimbleby

See also
Department of Philosophy, King's College London

References

External links
 Official Website

Departments of University College London
Philosophy departments in the United Kingdom